Vallouise-Pelvoux is a commune in the department of Hautes-Alpes, southeastern France. The municipality was established on 1 January 2017 by merger of the former communes of Pelvoux (the seat) and Vallouise.

The commune is located in the Alps and contains part of the Écrins National Park.

It is a popular destination for mountaineering and mountain sports in all seasons.

Geography

Climate
Vallouise-Pelvoux has a humid continental climate (Köppen climate classification Dfb).

See also 
Communes of the Hautes-Alpes department

References 

Communes of Hautes-Alpes

Communes nouvelles of Hautes-Alpes
Populated places established in 2017
2017 establishments in France